Yeondaeam is a temple located in Yeongyang County, Gyeongsangbuk-do, South Korea.

References 

Yeongyang County
Buddhist temples in South Korea
Buddhist temples of the Jogye Order
Buildings and structures in North Gyeongsang Province